Patrick Brompton is a village and civil parish in the Richmondshire district of North Yorkshire, England. It lies on the A684. The population of the parish at the 2001 Census was 155, rising to 167 at the 2011 Census. North Yorkshire County Council estimated the population to be at 170 in 2015.

St Patrick's Church is located in the centre of the village as well as the village pub, called The Green Tree. The Brompton Beck, which feeds into Bedale Beck, runs through the centre of the village.

Parish history 
In the 1880s, Patrick Brompton was described as:

a township and a parish in Leyburn district, N. R. Yorkshire. The township lies on an affluent of the river Swale, near the Northallerton and Leyburn railway, 4 miles NW by W of Bedale.
The village of Patrick Brompton and other villages in the parish are mentioned in the Domesday Book which was completed in 1086. When published, there were 27 households in the village consisting of 22 villagers and 5 smallholders. The 'Hundred', Count Alan also had 195 other places including Bedale and Bellerby.
The name 'Patrick Brompton' derives from the personal name 'Patrick' and Brompton derives from 'broom', a thorny bush or shrub and 'tun' deriving from an enclosure; a village; an estate. Patrick Brompton is also mentioned on the GENUKI website and in the 1820s, described as:

Patrick Brompton, (or East Brompton) a parish in the wapentake of Hang East & liberty of Richmondshire; 3½ miles NW. of Bedale. Here is a church dedicated to St. Patrick; the living is a Perpetual curacy, in the patronage of the Bishop of Chester. Here is a school endowed with about £20. per annum. Population, 158.

St Patrick's is the only church in the village which belongs to the Church of England Diocese of Leeds.

Other villages in the parish are Arrathorne, Hunton and Newton Le Willows. According to the 2011 census data, 137 people follow Christianity.

Population and Industry 
It had a population of 167 according to the 2011 census. By looking at 2011 census data we can see the age structure of the village. The mean age of the village is 49.8 and the age variable with the highest number is 45 to 59 with 50 people. This is 29.9% of the population. This suggests that the population of the village are of working ability and leave the village every day for work purposes.
On the right you can see a population time series graph showing the population of Patrick Brompton from 1801 to 2011. It displays a sharp drop in population around 1850. From the 1881 census data, we can see that agriculture is a primary source of work or occupation with 20 people from the village working in that field. Census data from 2011 now shows that the male population of Patrick Brompton work primarily in construction with 10 people, then 8 males working in manufacturing.

The dramatic drop in population around 1850 could be because the parish boundaries have changed over time.

Transport 
The nearest international airport is Leeds Bradford International Airport, approximately an hour away.

Housing 
According to the Office for National Statistics, there are 83 dwellings in Patrick Brompton, 48 of these being detached houses or bungalows. The average asking house price in Patrick Brompton is £309,000. In the history of housing in the village there was a sharp decrease in homes in the village from 265 in the 1851 census. to 36 in the 1881 census. This is similar, in the population figures, this could be because parish boundaries changed over this time.

Climate 
The average climate in Patrick Brompton ranges from a high of 20.4 degrees Celsius in July and a low of 1.4 degrees Celsius in December.

References

External links

Villages in North Yorkshire
Civil parishes in North Yorkshire